Golugonda is a village and a Mandal in Anakapalli district in the state of Andhra Pradesh in India. This village is famous for availability of semi-precious stones. Special police squads have been formed to prevent illegal quarrying of semi-precious stones both here and in other mandals in the district.

Assembly constituency
Golugonda was an assembly constituency in Andhra Pradesh.
 1951 - Kankipadi Veerana Padal and Killada Ramamurthy
 1955 - Ruthala Latchapatrudu

References

Villages in Anakapalli district